John Jordan may refer to:

Sportspeople 
John Jordan (basketball) (c. 1910–1991), American basketball player and coach for the University of Notre Dame
John Jordan (cricketer) (born 1932), English cricketer
Jack Jordan (1924–2007), Scottish footballer
Johnny Jordan (1921–2016), English footballer
Johnny Jordan (rugby league) (1906–1957), English rugby league footballer

Politicians 
John Jordan (died c. 1422), Member of Parliament for Dorchester 1397–1414
John W. Jordan (born 1926), American politician in Florida
John T. Jordan (1832–1886), mayor of Seattle
John Jordan (Canadian politician), MPP in Ontario

Others 
Sir John Jordan (diplomat) (1852–1925), British diplomat and Minister Plenipotentiary to China
John Jordan (judge), Irish judge
John Jordan (poet) (1930–1988), Irish poet
John Jordan (vintner), American vintner and Republican donor
John Q. Jordan, African American journalist